Haarla (Finnish; Harlax in Swedish) is a district and a suburb of the city of Turku, in Finland. It is located in the southern part of the island of Hirvensalo, off the city's coastline. The bridge between Hirvensalo and Satava is located in Haarla.

The current population of Haarla is 1,316, and it is increasing at an annual rate of 1.90%. 30.32% of the district's population are under 15 years old, while 2.28% are over 65. The district's linguistic makeup is 88.75% Finnish, 6.00% Swedish, and 5.24% other.

See also
 Districts of Turku
 Districts of Turku by population

Districts of Turku